Terpsimyia is a genus of fly in the family Dolichopodidae. It is known from the Indomalayan realm, and contains only one species, Terpsimyia semicincta, known from Taiwan and Thailand.

The genus was originally named Hadroscelus by Theodor Becker in 1922. However, this name was preoccupied by Hadroscelus Quendenfeldt, 1885, so the genus was renamed to Terpsimyia by C. E. Dyte in 1975.

References

Diaphorinae
Dolichopodidae genera
Monotypic Diptera genera
Diptera of Asia
Insects of Taiwan
Insects of Thailand